Mount Church could mean:

 Mount Church (Alaska), a peak of the Alaska Range
 Mount Church (Idaho), a peak in the Lost River Range
 Mount Church (Washington), a peak in the southern Olympic Mountains
 Mount Church (Virginia), a historic church built during colonial times that became part of Rappahannock Academy school